Gigantidas horikoshi is a species of large, deepwater, hydrothermal vent mussel, a marine bivalve mollusc in the family Mytilidae, the mussels.

References

 Science links info 

horikoshi
Molluscs of Japan
Molluscs described in 2005